The 2007 Hassanal Bolkiah Trophy is the third edition of the invitational tournament hosted by Brunei. The tournament take place in Brunei from 3–12 March 2007. Eight teams from the ASEAN Football Federation participate in the tournament for under the age of 22.

Thailand emerged as the champion after beating Myanmar by 5–4 in the final penalty shoot-out, while both Cambodia and Malaysia shared the third place.

Venues

Squads

Group stage 
 All times are Brunei Darussalam Time (BNT) – UTC+8.

Tie-breaking criteria 
The teams are ranked according to points (3 points for a win, 1 point for a tie, 0 points for a loss) and tie breakers are in following order:
 Greater number of points obtained in the group matches between the teams concerned;
 Goal difference resulting from the group matches between the teams concerned;
 Greater number of goals scored in the group matches between the teams concerned;
 Result of direct matches;
 Drawing of lots.

Group A

Group B

Knockout stage

Semi-finals

Final

Team statistics 
As per statistical convention in football, matches decided in extra time are counted as wins and losses, while matches decided by penalty shoot-outs are counted as draws.

References

External links 
 2007 Results

2007 in Asian football
2002
2007 in Brunei football
2007 in Burmese football
2007 in Malaysian football
2007 in Philippine football
2007 in Laotian football
2007 in Vietnamese football
2007 in Singaporean football
2007 in Thai football